Tambaú is a municipality in the state of São Paulo in Brazil. The population is 23,232 (2020 est.) in an area of 562 km². The elevation is 698 m. Tambaú was famous for the annual sermons of Padre Donizetti.

References

Municipalities in São Paulo (state)